Paolo Gucci  (29 March 1931 – 10 October 1995) was an Italian businessman and fashion designer. He was the one-time chief designer and vice-president of Gucci. He is credited with helping design Gucci's famous double G logo.

Early life and career
Paolo Gucci was born on 29 March 1931 in Florence, the son of Olwen Price and Aldo Gucci, who was the son of Gucci founder Guccio Gucci. He was the chief designer of Gucci in the late 1960s. In 1978, his father named him the vice-president of Gucci.

In 1980, Paolo secretly launched his own business using the Gucci name without telling his father, nor his uncle Rodolfo. When they found out, they were both infuriated and fired him from Gucci in September 1980. In addition, his father Aldo sued him, threatening to cut off any Gucci supplier who signed on with Paolo.

In 1984, seeking revenge, Paolo got his father Aldo removed from the company with the help of his cousin Maurizio Gucci, who had recently become the majority shareholder. In addition, Paolo also tipped off the IRS about his father's tax evasion. In 1986, Aldo was sentenced to one year and one day in prison for tax evasion. In 1987, Paolo sold all his shares in Gucci to Investcorp for $42.5 million. Due to spending extravagant amounts of money and bad business decisions, he filed for bankruptcy in 1993.

Personal life 

In 1952, Paolo Gucci married Yvonne Moschetto and had two daughters with her, Elisabetta and Patrizia. Their marriage dissolved, and in 1977, he married British socialite Jenny Garwood and had one daughter with her, Gemma Gucci. In 1990, he separated from his second wife Jenny Garwood after having an affair with 19-year-old Penny Armstrong. He had two children with her out of wedlock, Alyssa and Gabriele. In 1994, he spent five weeks in prison for failing to pay alimony and child support to his second wife Jenny Garwood and their daughter. Paolo Gucci died in London on October 10, 1995, at age 64 of  chronic hepatitis in the midst of divorce proceedings.

Arms

Guccio Gucci; his eldest living biological son, Aldo Gucci; Aldo Gucci's sons, Giorgio Gucci, Paolo Gucci, and Roberto Gucci; and grandson Uberto Gucci claimed the right to use an inherited, ancestral coat of arms after the Kingdom of Italy, which was ruled by the House of Savoy, transitioned to the Italian Republic in 1946.

The blazon recorded, as recorded in the Archives of Florence, is as follows: "Blue, three red poles bordered with silver; a head of gold, to the right a blue wheel, and to the left a red rose." ("D'azzurro, a tre pali di rosso bordati d'argento; e al capo d'oro caricato a destra di una ruota d'azzurro, e a sinistra di una rosa di rosso.")

Translation: "Family of San Miniato; Giacinto Gucci and his brothers were admitted to the nobility of San Miniato in 1763 (on that occasion it is declared that the family had come from Cremona in 1224); Giuseppe di Gaetano Gucci, on the other hand, was admitted to the nobility of Fiesole in 1839. Francesco di Benedetto Gucci obtained Florentine citizenship in 1601, for the Golden Lion banner; Giovanni Battista by Giovan Piero Gucci obtained it in 1634, in the Scala banner."

Court documents, records, and subsequent rulings indicate that, because the Gucci family trademarked the coat-of-arms in 1955, the trademark transferred with the sale of the Gucci company by Maurizio Gucci to Investcorp, and subsequent company owners, in 1993. However, Uberto Gucci (b. 1960), the son of Roberto Gucci, the nephew of Paolo Gucci, and the grandson of Aldo Gucci, claims that the Gucci family still has the right to use the ancestral Gucci coat-of-arms.

In popular culture
In the film House of Gucci (2021), Paolo Gucci is played by American actor Jared Leto. In April 2021, Paolo's daughter Patrizia Gucci criticized Leto's portrayal (unkempt hair, lilac suit) of her father in the film, stating that she "still feels offended". Despite this, Leto's performance received praise from film critics and earned him nominations for a Critics' Choice Movie Award and Satellite Award—both for Best Supporting Actor.

References 

1931 births
1995 deaths
Gucci people
Fashion designers from Florence
Italian fashion designers
20th-century Italian businesspeople
Deaths from hepatitis
Italian expatriates in the United Kingdom